Vicki D. Huff is an American geneticist and cancer researcher. She is a professor in the department of genetics and the director of the Sequence and Microarray Facility at University of Texas MD Anderson Cancer Center. Huff is also a professor at UTHealth Graduate School of Biomedical Sciences. She completed a doctor of philosophy in human genetics at University of Michigan in 1987. From 1987 to 1990, Huff was a postdoctoral fellow in biochemistry and molecular biology at MD Anderson Cancer Center.

References 

Living people
Year of birth missing (living people)
American geneticists
American women geneticists
University of Texas MD Anderson Cancer Center faculty
University of Michigan alumni
Cancer researchers
20th-century American scientists
21st-century American scientists
20th-century American women scientists
21st-century American women scientists